Manfredo is a given name. Notable people with the name include:

Manfredo Alipala, Filipino boxer who competed at the 1964 Summer Olympics
Manfredo do Carmo (1928–2018), Brazilian mathematician, former president of the Brazilian Mathematical Society
Manfredo Fanti (1806–1865), Italian general, founder of the Regio Esercito
Manfredo Fest (1936–1999), legally blind bossa nova and jazz pianist and keyboardist from Brazil
Peter Manfredo Jr. (born 1980), American professional boxer and former IBO middleweight champion
Manfredo Manfredi (1859–1927), Italian architect
Manfredo de Clermont, Conte di Motica (died 1391), Sicilian nobleman
Manfredo Pietrantonio (born 1998), Italian football player
Manfredo I of Saluzzo (died 1175), the first marquess of Saluzzo, serving in that capacity from 1125 until his death
Manfredo II of Saluzzo (1140–1215), the second marquess of Saluzzo from his father's death in 1175 to his own
Manfredo III of Saluzzo (died 1244), the third Marquess of Saluzzo, from 1215 to his death
Manfredo IV of Saluzzo (died 1330), the fifth marquess of Saluzzo from 1296, the son and successor of Thomas I
Manfredo V of Saluzzo, marquess of Saluzzo from 1330 and 1332, and later usurper from 1341 to 1342
Manfredo Tafuri (1935–1994), an Italian architect, historian, theoretician, critic and academic

See also
Monument to General Manfredo Fanti, Florence
Manfred
Manfredonia